George Whyte (24 March 1909 – 23 October 1992) was a Scottish professional footballer who scored 49 goals from 372 appearances in the Football League playing for Accrington Stanley and  Lincoln City. He also played in the Scottish Football League for Dunfermline Athletic, for Rhyl Athletic in Wales, and for English non-league club Gainsborough Trinity. He played as a left half or outside left.

Life and career
Whyte was born in Cowdenbeath, Fife, Scotland, and played in the Scottish Football League for Dunfermline Athletic. He moved south to play for Welsh club Rhyl Athletic and then signed for Third Division North club Accrington Stanley. He made his debut in the 1929–30 Football League season, and went on to make 73 league appearances, scoring 15 goals, before he and Stanley teammate Harold Riley joined fellow Northern Section club Lincoln City in the 1931 close season. According to a season preview in the Daily Express, Whyte was "expected to be a useful substitute" for Walter Lax, who had been transferred to Blackpool for a "substantial sum".

Whyte made his debut in the first match of 1931–32 and played in every match that season as Lincoln won the Northern Section title and promotion to the Second Division. Originally an outside left, he was converted to play at left half in the following season. Whyte set a club record of 183 consecutive appearances in league matches, between March 1934 and September 1938. He left Lincoln at the end of the 1938–39 season, having made 322 appearances in all first-team competitions, a total that at the time was the third-highest in the club's history.

After his football career ended, Whyte worked for the Lincoln Co-operative Society. He died in 1992 at the age of 83.

References

1909 births
1992 deaths
People from Cowdenbeath
Scottish footballers
Association football forwards
Association football wing halves
Dunfermline Athletic F.C. players
Rhyl F.C. players
Accrington Stanley F.C. (1891) players
Lincoln City F.C. players
Gainsborough Trinity F.C. players
Scottish Football League players
English Football League players
Place of death missing
Footballers from Fife